Miss Universe 2016 was the 65th Miss Universe pageant, held at the SM Mall of Asia Arena, in Pasay, Metro Manila, Philippines on January 30, 2017. This is the second time in the history of the competition that the pageant skipped an entire year, following the 2014 pageant which was held in January 2015.

At the end of the event, Pia Wurtzbach of the Philippines crowned Iris Mittenaere of France as Miss Universe 2016. This is France's first victory in 63 years, and the second victory of the country in the pageant's history.

Contestants from 86 countries and territories competed in this year's pageant. The competition featured Steve Harvey as host, and supermodel Ashley Graham as the backstage host. American entertainers Flo Rida and Boyz II Men performed in this year's pageant.

Background

Location and date
The Miss Universe Organization was in talks to host the Miss Universe 2016 competition in the Philippines. Discussions began when Miss Universe 2015 Pia Wurtzbach met with then-Philippine President Rodrigo Duterte. Although Duterte was open to having the pageant hosted by the Philippines, he did not want the government to pay the expense of doing so.  About two weeks after the meeting, the Department of Tourism named the Philippines as the host country. According to Miss Universe Organization president Paula Shugart, the Philippines is the organization's top choice for hosting the pageant. However, other countries were being considered, according to a spokesperson for the department.

Despite the statement made by the Department of Tourism, the decision to hold the pageant in the Philippines is not yet final, and over the next few months, the Miss Universe Organization changed its mind several times on the matter. Initial reports did not disclose the reasons for the breakdowns in negotiations, but a report linked the Organization's concerns with Duterte's controversial remarks regarding U.S. President Barack Obama, as well as his plans to separate ties between the Philippines and the United States. These statements were not received well by WME/IMG. Another statement by Duterte, in which he said he would be glad to kill as many drug addicts as Adolf Hitler killed Jews during the Holocaust led to WME CEO Ariel Zev Emanuel to cancel the talks. Ilocos Sur governor Chavit Singson, chairman of the LCS Group, sent representatives, including some Jewish friends, to the United States to persuade Emanuel to maintain his interest in a Philippines-hosted event. Duterte's apology for his Holocaust-related remark helped in the renegotiation. Also helpful was Singson's offer to add women-empowerment programs to the pageant.

In September 2016, according to then-Secretary of Tourism Wanda Tulfo-Teo, the SM Mall of Asia Arena in Pasay was announced to be the main venue of the pageant. The Philippine Arena was the other venue considered by the Department of Tourism, but the organization disapproved due to "security reasons".

The final decision was made by the Miss Universe Organization on November 3, 2016, when Wurtzbach revealed via video message that the Philippines will be the host. The pageant will take place at the SM Mall of Asia Arena in Pasay on January 30, 2017. On November 16, the collaboration agreement was signed, and the pageant's official website and Facebook page were launched on the same day.

Host and performers 
On November 3, 2016, the Miss Universe Organization confirmed that Steve Harvey would host the 2016 edition. Initially, then-Philippine President Rodrigo Duterte expressed hesitation on Harvey hosting the event due to Harvey announcing the wrong winner at the Miss Universe 2015 pageant. However, due to Harvey's five-year contract with Miss Universe, Harvey remained as host. In response to Duterte's remarks, then-Secretary of Tourism Wanda Tulfo-Teo proposed the idea of having a Filipino woman co-host the event. On December 15, 2016, plus-sized model Ashley Graham confirmed the news that she has been selected to be the backstage host of the pageant. On January 19, 2017, Flo Rida was announced as a guest performer.

Selection of participants 
Contestants from 86 countries and territories were selected to compete in the pageant. Eight of these delegates were appointees to their titles after being a runner-up of their national pageant or an audition process or other internal selection, while four were selected to replace the original dethroned winner.

Stephanie Geldhof, the first runner-up of Miss Belgium 2016, was appointed to represent Belgium after Lenty Frans, Miss Belgium 2016, will only compete at Miss World 2016 due to conflicting schedules with the Miss Belgium 2017 pageant slated for January 2017. Jenny Kim, the first runner-up of Miss World Korea 2015, was appointed by the Miss Universe Korea Organization after the Miss Korea organization relinquished the franchise. Kushboo Ramnawaj was appointed by the Miss Estrella Mauritius Organization after the Miss Mauritius organization relinquished the franchise. Yuliana Korolkova, the first runner-up of Miss Russia 2016, was appointed as Miss Universe Russia 2016 after Yana Dobrovolskaya, Miss Russia 2016, will only compete at Miss World 2016 due to the conflicting schedules of the two pageants.

Paula Schneider, Miss Bolivia 2015, originally was supposed to represent Bolivia in Miss Universe 2016. However, due to personal reasons, Schneider resigned as Miss Bolivia 2015, thus barring her from competing in Miss Universe. Due to this, Antonella Moscatelli, Miss Bolivia 2016, took the responsibility as the representative of Bolivia in Miss Universe 2016. Regina Valter, Miss Universe Kazakhstan 2015, originally was supposed to compete in Miss Universe 2016 after her withdrawal in 2015. However, Valter was disqualified after getting married. Due to this, Darina Kulsitova, Miss Universe Kazakhstan 2016, replaced Valter as the representative of Kazakhstan in Miss Universe. Brenda Jimenez, the first runner-up of Miss Universe Puerto Rico 2016, was crowned the new Miss Universe Puerto Rico 2016 after Kristhielee Caride, the original winner, was dethroned due to dismissive behaviour. Đặng Thị Lệ Hằng, the second runner-up of Miss Universe Vietnam 2015, was appointed as the representative of Vietnam to Miss Universe after Ngô Trà My, the first runner-up of Miss Universe Vietnam 2015, refused to compete and got married.

The 2016 edition saw the debut of Sierra Leone and the returns of Barbados, Belize, Guam, Iceland, Kazakhstan, Kenya, Malta, Namibia, Romania, Slovenia, Sri Lanka, Switzerland, and the United States Virgin Islands. Malta last competed in 2001, Barbados and Belize last competed in 2007, Iceland last competed in 2009, US Virgin Islands last competed in 2011, Namibia and Romania last competed in 2013, while the others last competed in 2014. El Salvador, Gabon, Ghana, Greece, Ireland, Lebanon, Montenegro, and Serbia withdrew. Adela Zoranic of Montenegro and Bojana Bojanic of Serbia withdrew from the competition due to unknown reasons. El Salvador, Gabon, Ghana, Greece, Ireland, and Lebanon withdrew after their respective organizations failed to hold a national competition or appoint a delegate.

Results

Placements

§ - Voted in the Top 13 by viewers

Special awards

Pageant

Format
The Miss Universe Organization introduced several specific changes to the format for this edition. The number of semifinalists was reduced to 13— the lowest since 2002. The results of the preliminary competition— which consisted of the swimsuit and evening gown competition, and the closed-door interview, determined the 12 semifinalists. Internet voting returned, with fans being able to vote for another delegate to advance into the semifinals, making the number of semifinalists 13. The Top 13 participated in the swimsuit competition, with 9 advancing in the competition for the evening gown competition. Six contestants will advance into the Top 6, and will participate in the question and answer portion. From six, three will advance into the Final 3 and will participate in the final question and the final walk.

Selection committee 
Cynthia Bailey – model, television personality and actress
Mickey Boardman – editorial director and advice columnist for Paper magazine
Francine LeFrak – activist and founder of Same Sky and support foundation for people living with HIV
Leila Lopes – Miss Universe 2011 from Angola
Sushmita Sen – Miss Universe 1994 from India
Dayanara Torres – Miss Universe 1993 from Puerto Rico

Contestants
86 contestants competed for the title.

Notes

References

External links

2017 beauty pageants
2017 in the Philippines
Beauty pageants in the Philippines
2016
January 2017 events in the Philippines
Pasay
Events in Metro Manila
Simulcasts